Viththal Dattatreya Ghate (Devanagari: विठ्ठल दत्तात्रेय घाटे) (1894–1978) was an educationist and a Marathi writer from Maharashtra, India. He was born in Ghospuri in Ahmednagar district. After spending childhood in Ahmednagar he went to Gujarat. Later he lived in Malwa, Indore, Gwalher and came back to Maharashtra. He spent one year in London and later revisited there after 30 years.

His books include:

 दिवस असे होते Autobiography, 1961
 विचार-विलसिते
 पांढरे केस, हिरवी मने
 काही म्हातारे व एक म्हातारी

He presided over Marathi Sahitya Sammelan in Ahmedabad in 1953. 
His book Pandhre Kesa Hirvi Manne ( Grey hairs, green hearts) tells the story of old people who have developed love for natural things and the love remains until their last breath.
He was the son of Marathi poet Dattatreya Ghate who wrote poetry under the pen name Kavi Datta (कवी दत्त).

Marathi-language writers
1894 births
1978 deaths
Presidents of the Akhil Bharatiya Marathi Sahitya Sammelan